Martin Lee (born 26 November 1946) is an English singer-songwriter, best known as a member of the pop group Brotherhood of Man.

Early career 
Lee was born Martin Barnes in Purley, Surrey, but spent five years of his youth in Australia. As a teenager, he had a great interest in music and after learning to play guitar he formed his first band. In the early 1970s, he came to the attention of songwriter and publisher Tony Hiller, while he was working as lead singer with the Johnny Howard Band. Hiller signed him up to his company, Tony Hiller Music initially as a writer. On discovering that he could sing as well, he asked him to be part of the group he managed, Brotherhood of Man. The group had recently disbanded and Hiller was keen to put a new line-up together. Along with Lee Sheriden and Nicky Stevens and later Sandra Stevens, the new line-up was born. Lee had already released a solo single by this time, a song called "Cry José", but it failed to gain much interest. Working alongside Hiller and Sheriden, he began composing new songs for the group during 1972. The following year they released their first single and the year after, their first hit. Lee quickly emerged as the lead singer of the group, taking the lead on many of their songs, including that first hit "Lady".

Eurovision win 
In 1975, Brotherhood of Man scored their first European No.1 with the song "Kiss Me Kiss Your Baby", again with a Martin Lee lead vocal. Later that year, the writing team set about composing a song they would enter for the Eurovision Song Contest.

The song they came up with was "Save Your Kisses for Me" and featured Lee on lead vocals. The song went on to win the Eurovision and made No.1 in several countries including the UK, where it became a million seller. Lee received three Ivor Novello Awards for this composition.

The group continued this run of success over the next three years with two more UK No.1 hits "Angelo" and "Figaro" - both co-written by Lee.

Lee still performs with Brotherhood of Man today as they regularly tour the UK and appear on television throughout Europe.

Personal life 
Martin Lee spent five years of his early life in Australia. His mother died when he was young and with his father, he returned to the UK.

Soon after she joined the group in late 1973, Sandra Stevens began a relationship with Lee, and they were living together by the time of their Eurovision win in 1976. Lee married Stevens in August 1979. They live in Surrey.

References

1949 births
Living people
English male singers
People from Purley, London
Eurovision Song Contest entrants for the United Kingdom
Eurovision Song Contest winners
Ivor Novello Award winners
Eurovision Song Contest entrants of 1976
Brotherhood of Man members